Canelo Álvarez vs. Caleb Plant, was a super middleweight unification professional boxing match contested between WBA (Super), WBC, WBO and The Ring champion Canelo Álvarez and IBF champion Caleb Plant to determine the first undisputed super middleweight champion in boxing history. The bout took place at MGM Grand Garden Arena in Paradise, Nevada on November 6, 2021. Álvarez won the bout via 11th-round technical knockout.

Background

A deal was closed for the fight to take place at the MGM Grand Garden Arena in Paradise, Nevada on September 18, 2021, but talks broke down over disagreements in the contract. A potential fight with WBA (Super) light heavyweight champion Dmitry Bivol then seemed likely for Álvarez, however the September 18 date was scrapped. A deal was revisited between the two parties for a fight in November 2021. On August 19, 2021, both fighters were confirmed to have agreed to terms and soon afterwards, the fight was officially announced on Álvarez's Instagram page.

On September 21, 2021, the two fighters were engaged in a brief onstage scuffle during their first press conference, in which Álvarez initiated physical contact during their face-off when he shoved Plant. Álvarez stated that he had done this because he took offense to Plant's use of the word "motherfucker", interpreting it as an insult to his mother. Plant denied to reporters that he had used the common American curse word in that context. Moreover, he drew attention to Álvarez's hypocrisy, accurately indicating that Álvarez had previously used the same slur against Demetrius Andrade on the night of May 8, 2021 in the aftermath of his fight against Billy Joe Saunders in Arlington, Texas.

The bouts featured on the PPV undercard were announced on October 18, 2021, with Anthony Dirrell facing off against Marcos Hernandez, Rey Vargas going up against Leonardo Baez, and Elvis Rodriguez taking on Juan Pablo Romero.

Fight card

Broadcasting

Reception
The fight generated a live gate of around $18,000,000 from the 16,586 tickets sold in the sold-out show. The card was reported to have sold around 800,000 PPV buys in the US. At the price of $79.95, the card generated roughly $64 million of domestic revenue.

References 



2021 in boxing
Boxing matches involving Canelo Álvarez
November 2021 sports events in the United States
2021 in sports in Nevada
Boxing in Las Vegas
Boxing on Showtime
Events in Paradise, Nevada